Felix Lebarty - also known as Lover Boy - is a Nigerian singer/songwriter and record producer. He is best known for the 1989 single "Ifeoma" from the One Life To Live album, but has since reinvented himself as a pastor, and currently runs his own Christian ministry.

Music
Lebarty gained music experience with his older brother, highlife musician Aigbe Lebarty, before embarking on a solo career. His first release was the album Girls For Sale, but achieved his breakthrough with 1982's Lover Boy, with the title track becoming his showbiz moniker. 
Lebarty's music was well-received in Eastern Nigeria, particularly within the Igbo community, and some of his songs were odes to Igbo women, including "Ego", "Chi-Chi", "Ada", "Uchenna", Ngozi, and "Nneka". In 1989, a decade into his career as a recording artiste, Lebarty released the album One Life to Live which featured what would become his signature song, "Ifeoma". 

Following the release of his final album as a secular artist, 1992's 419, Lebarty relocated to the United States where he established a taxi firm business, returning to Nigeria five years later.

Ministry
Born into an African traditionalist family, Lebarty converted to Islam at the height of his fame but became a born-again Christian in the 90s. With the support of fellow 80s singer-turned-preacher Chris Okotie,  Lebarty attended bible school in America and is now the pastor of his own ministry.

Personal life
Lebarty, whose father died when his son was 3, is the father of 19 children by seven different women.  He is legally married to Rosemary, the mother of his first four children including fashion designer/singer Ivie - the couple initially split following Lebarty's numerous affairs with other women, but reunited after he discovered Christianity. Lebarty has since expressed his regrets over his former lifestyle, and now preaches against polygamy and secular music.

Discography

Girls For Sale - 1979

Don't Take My Girl (as "Felix Lebarty and the Gang") - 1979

Felix Lebarty & Dynamite Rock (as "Felix Lebarty & Dynamite Rock") - 1979

Lover Boy - 1982
 
Lover Boy '83 (Sequel album) - 1983

Bobo - 1984

African Boy - 1986

One Life To Live - 1989

Better Be Sure - 1991

419  (Final album) - 1992

References

Nigerian male musicians
Living people
English-language singers from Nigeria
Nigerian music industry executives
Year of birth missing (living people)
Musicians from Edo State